Gisle Christian Johnson (10 September 1822 – 17 July 1894) was a leading 19th-century Norwegian theologian and educator.

Biography
Gisle Christian Johnson was born at Fredrikshald (now Halden) in Østfold, Norway. He grew up at Kristiansand  in Vest-Agder. He was a son of engineer and architect Georg Daniel Barth Johnson (1794-1872). He studied theology at the University of Christiania (now University of Oslo) and graduated in 1845.  In 1849 he became a lecturer at the University of Christiania, and in 1860 a professor, first in systematic theology and Dogmatic theology and from 1875 in church history.

In 1855, he founded the Christiania Inner Mission Society (Christiania Indremissionsforening), in 1863 the Lutheran Church Official Journal (Luthersk Kirketidende) and in 1867 the Norwegian Luther Foundation (Den norske Lutherstiftelse). In 1858 he established, together with Carl Paul Caspari, an annual publication entitled  Theologisk Tidskrift for den evangelisk-lutherske Kirke i Norge  which he edited until 1891. Religiously he followed strict Confessional Lutheranism. During a revival which went across Norway during the 1850s, he reflected the pietistic and ecclesial tradition of Hans Nielsen Hauge.  Johnson emphasized a theology that was both based on the experience of faith and grounded in  Lutheran orthodoxy.

 
He was a member of the Royal Norwegian Society of Sciences and Letters from 1858. He was appointed a Knight in the Order of St. Olav in 1866 and made a Commander 1st class in 1882. In 1879, he was conferred an honorary doctorate by the University of Copenhagen. He died during 1894 at Nøtterøy in Vestfold, Norway. Both Gisle Johnsons plass in the district of Grünerløkka in Oslo and  Gisle Johnsons gate in Trondheim were named in his honor.

Works
 Grundrids af Den systematiske teologi (Foundations of the systematic theology) (1878)
 Forelæsninger over dogmehistorien (Lectures in dogmatic history) (1898)

See also
Lutheran orthodoxy

References

1822 births
1894 deaths
Clergy from Kristiansand
University of Oslo alumni 
Academic staff of the University of Oslo
Norwegian Lutheran theologians
19th-century Norwegian Lutheran clergy
Royal Norwegian Society of Sciences and Letters
 Recipients of the St. Olav's Medal
Burials at the Cemetery of Our Saviour